Sharran Alexander (born 1965 in Maida Vale, London), is a sumo wrestler who is listed in British Sumo Federation as 2nd Kyu grade.

Background
Alexander is a child minder by profession. She first joined the British Sumo team for a Channel 4 television show  called Strictly Lady Sumo to find four women to compete in the world Championships, signed up by her children. She began competing in Sumo competitions in 2006 at the age of 41.

Career
Alexander is one of the few women recognized by the British Sumo Federation and has won four gold medals in international competitions. In 2006 Alexander competed in 25 different competitions and went to Japan to represent Great Britain in the World Sumo Championship. Since then, she has competed in international tournaments such as the US Sumo Open in 2013, where she was defeated by the 175-pound Liz Seward in the final open weight match.

Family
Alexander is divorced, and has three children.

See also
Glossary of sumo terms

References

External links
 British Sumo Federation
 Standard News Coverage
 Guinness World Records 2013

English sumo wrestlers
Female sumo wrestlers
Living people
1965 births